The Trésor de la langue française (TLF, subtitled Dictionnaire de la langue du XIXe et du XXe siècle (1789–1960)) is a 16-volume dictionary of 19th- and 20th-century French published by the Centre de Recherche pour un Trésor de la Langue Française from 1971 to 1994. Its electronic edition, the Trésor de la langue française informatisé (TLFi), is available on CD-ROM and on the Web.

Statistics
 100,000 words with history
 270,000 definitions
 430,000 citations

Volumes 
 1971 : vol. 1 - A-Affiner, CXXXIV-878
 1973 : vol. 2 - Affinerie-Anfractuosité, XIX-987
 1974 : vol. 3 - Ange-Badin, XXIV-1206 
 1975 : vol. 4 - Badinage-Cage, XXIV-1166 
 1977 : vol. 5 - Cageot-Constat, XXIV-1425 
 1978 : vol. 6 - Constatation-Désobliger, XVI-1308 
 1979 : vol. 7 - Désobstruer-Épicurisme, XXIII-1343 
 1980 : vol. 8 - Épicycle-Fuyard, XIX-1364 
 1981 : vol. 9 - G-Incarner, XVIII-1338 
 1983 : vol. 10 - Incartade-Losangique, XXI-1381 
 1985 : vol. 11 - Lot-Natalité, XVIII-1339 
 1986 : vol. 12 - Natation-Pénétrer, XIX-1337 
 1988 : vol. 13 - Pénible-Ptarmigan, XIX-1449 
 1990 : vol. 14 - Ptère-Salaud, XVII-1451 
 1992 : vol. 15 - Sale-Teindre, XVIII-1451 
 1994 : vol. 16 - Teint-Zzz, XVIII-1452

External links
 History of the TLF (in French)
 Detailed information on the TLF (in French)
 The on-line edition

French dictionaries